Marion County School District may refer to:

Marion County Schools (Alabama)
Marion County Public Schools, Florida
Marion County School District (Georgia)
Marion–Florence USD 408, Kansas
Marion County School District (Mississippi)
Marion County R-II School District (Missouri)
Marion City School District (Ohio)
Marion County Schools (Tennessee)
Marion County Schools (West Virginia)